Rod Stewart: Hits 2016 was a concert tour by British musician Rod Stewart, traveling throughout Europe, alo in support of his twenty-ninth studio album Another Country.

Background
The tour will begin on 14 May 2016, in Amsterdam, the Netherlands at the Ziggo Dome and will continue throughout Europe and the United Kingdom before concluding on 9 July 2016, in Cap Roig, Spain at the Jardines de Cap Roig. Currently, the tour is planned to travel across Europe and the United Kingdom with a total of twenty-four shows.

Shows

Cancellations and rescheduled shows

Notes

References

External links
 Official Website

2016 concert tours
Concerts at Malmö Arena